"Light Up The World" is the sixteenth single from the British group Steps, released in 2012 to promote their fourth studio album Light Up the World. The track saw the group reunited with long term collaborators Topham & Twigg. The single failed to live up to the group's previous success and missed the UK top 75 entirely, charting at number 82 - breaking their string of top 5 hits that they achieved between 1998 and 2001.

Music video
No music video was recorded to support the track, however a winter themed lyric video was produced and released to YouTube.

Personnel
Lee Latchford-Evans – lead and backing vocals
Claire Richards – lead and backing vocals
Lisa Scott-Lee – lead and backing vocals
Faye Tozer – lead and backing vocals
Ian "H" Watkins – lead and backing vocals

Track listings

Digital Download 1
 "Light Up The World"

Digital Download 2
 "Light Up The World (7th Heaven Remix) - 5:46"
 "Light Up The World (7th Heaven Radio Edit) - 3:44"

The remix contained instrumental elements of Steps' biggest hit, "Tragedy".

Chart performance
The single entered the UK Singles Chart at number 82 and fell out of the chart the following week.

Chart positions

References

2012 singles
Steps (group) songs
Pop ballads
Songs written by Karl Twigg
2012 songs